This is a bibliography of notable works about Varanasi.

Bibliography

See also

 Bibliography of India
 History of India
 Indian literature
 Indology
 in Wikiversity →Varanasi Bibliography

External links
 Banaras Bibliography. Extensive bibliography published by the Südasien-Institut at Heidelberg University.

Varanasi
Varanasi
Indian literature-related lists
Indology
Varanasi
Varanasi-related lists
Books about Varanasi